Radio Pilipinas is an Internet radio station in the United States and the Philippines.

History 
Radio Pilipinas started in 2005. It was first called Fatal Radio. The Internet radio was a partnership of young American DJs in United States and Filipino DJs in the Philippines. The 24-hour streaming time was divided into 12 hours for the USA and 12 hours for the Philippines. Each would broadcast during daytime of their respective time zone. The main organizers of fatalradio were Jamez Strickland, Jake Williams, Michael Walker, Nolit Abanilla and Alexis Moreno.

The American side played mostly Hip hop and Alternative music. Among its regular DJs include the brother of Evanescence drummer who also has his own band. The Philippine side on the other hand played mostly Pinoy rock of the 90s as well as new wave stuff. Kuyakurt was the main DJ for the Filipino stream. The Filipino partners took charge of designing and managing the site while the American partners did the technical as well as financed the radio.

Towards the end of 2005, cultural differences and persistent tug of war on streaming time brought out a split in Fatal Radio. The American partners decided to set up a new radio of their own. The Filipino staff went on streaming with Fatal Radio until financial issues forced the server to shut down. In 2006, Fatal Radio continued to stream from an unstable free shoutcast server. However this was limited to a few listeners thus marketing the radio was futile.

In 2007, Kuyakurt and Nolit decided to revamp the Internet radio and decided to name it Radio Pilipinas. Jeffrey McAdder financed the acquisition of the domain and nolithosting provided the site. Getting a new dedicated shoutcast server was hard as financial issues continue to plaque the staff. So the staff decided to run its site with a simple player of serverside mp3 files and let the listeners choose from a playlist whatever they want to play. The staff still continued on using the free shoutcast server with limited listener capacity from time to time.

Towards the end of 2008, nolithosting has acquired the ownership of Radio Pilipinas domain and got a shoutcast server installed in one of its collocated computers on a datacenter in Dallas, USA. The new development paved the way for Kuyakurt and Nolit to redevelop Radio Pilipinas as a full Internet radio running on shoutcast server. Radio Pilipinas is currently running on one source server with two backup servers all running on state of the art centovacast software. A total of 4 relay servers are also running - three are on 64kbit/s with hundreds of listener capacity. One server is on 32kbit/s which is intended for listeners with dial up connections. This server runs on a random playlist not synch with the main server but of similar content.

In 2009, Indiepinoy, a registered independent music label in the Philippines, acquired the ownership of radiopilipinas. It a;so moved it streaming server from USA to UK running both on icecast and shoutcast still running on low bitrate in order to accommodate internet users with slow connections. The stream has been consistently running 24/7 up to the present.

Current DJs 
LEx Saturday
DJ Angela
Nolit
Mama Gee

References

External links 
Official website
Radio Pilipinas' Official Facebook fanpage

2005 establishments in the Philippines
Internet radio stations in the Philippines
Radio stations established in 2005